1973 ACC tournament may refer to:

 1973 ACC men's basketball tournament
 1973 Atlantic Coast Conference baseball tournament